Thitarodes markamensis is a species of moth of the family Hepialidae. It was described by Yang in 1992, and is known from the Tibet Autonomous Region in China.

References

External links
Hepialidae genera

Moths described in 1992
Hepialidae